Het Goudblommeke in Papier ("The Paper Marigold") or La Fleur en Papier doré ("The Gilt-Paper Flower") is a historic café/brasserie established in 1944 at 55, rue des Alexiens/Cellebroersstraat in Brussels, Belgium.

The painter René Magritte, the novelist Louis Paul Boon, and the cartoonist Hergé were all at one time regulars. It was a meeting place for artists in the CoBrA movement, and in 1955 the writer Hugo Claus held his wedding reception there.

The café was registered as a protected monument in 1997. The building is owned by the Public Centre for Social Welfare of the city of Brussels, and partially sublet by AB InBev to the association that runs the café. 

Since May 2011, the interior courtyard of the pub displays a comic strip fresco by the cartoonists De Marck and De Wulf (Stam et Pilou). 

In January 2021 it was reported that the COVID-19 pandemic in Belgium had left the business's future precarious.

References

External links
 

1944 establishments in Belgium
Buildings and structures in Brussels
Protected heritage sites in Brussels